St. Francis' College (SFC) is a senior secondary boys-only private school in Lucknow, India, established and administered by The Catholic Diocese of Lucknow, a charitable religious society. The college was founded in 1885 as St. Francis' School and Orphanage. This well-renowned school of Lucknow is named in respect of Francis of Assisi, their Patron.

History

Colonial 
 26 April 1885: Revered Father Norbert, the Parish Priest of St.Joseph's Church, took two students under his guidance and teaching instructions. Father Norbert thus founded the St. Francis' School and Orphanage with his bungalow serving as classrooms, kitchen and dormitory. (Presently Cathedral Senior Secondary School stands where the priest house was located.)
 26 March 1886: After the early demise of Fr. Norbert, a Belgian Capuchin, Father Emmanuel van den Bosch, acceded to his position. The growing number of students called for a new building structure.
 4 May 1890:  Father Bartholomew set forth the foundation of St. Francis' Boarding and Day School for boys, with monetary support from the Bishop of Allahabad.
 1893: Father Bartholomew constructed the new priest house (presently, the Bishop's House) and gave the old presbytery to be used as boys' dorm.
 1894: The school was subsumed under the Educational Department and hence recognized for secondary education level. Shortage of financial resources and land were hampering the expansion and progress of the institution.
 1908: Land with a center building, next to the church on Shahnazaf Road, was bought by the Bishop of Allahabad, Fr. Petronius Hramigna, for the school and the edifice of St. Francis' College has stood there ever since.
 1 June 1910: Father Celestine, the newly appointed Principal, put forward a construction plan for a new building on the recently purchased property to the Educational Department. Although the proposal was accepted, the subsidy approval was taking a lot of time. Finally, the amount was provided with some contribution from the Diocese.
 6 May 1915: Father Celestine laid the foundation stones for the two new buildings to be constructed, one serving as the school hall and classes, other as the boarding dorm. Currently they are the Gymnasium and Old Concert Hall respectively.
 January 1918: The buildings were completed by the Messrs. P. Labanti & Company of Italy, despite the difficulties met due to material cost in those years of conflicts and revolts between the British Government and India. A playground was added to the front of the plot for sports, and games.
  7 February 1918: The Lieutenant Governor of Uttar Pradesh, Sir James Meston, visited the school. As the school was still on the watch for more land, the large plot behind the current plot was purchased to serve as the Backfield, along with the Dayal Bagh Land.
 1921: St. Francis' College was given the stature of high school and was affiliated to the Cambridge University for the Senior Cambridge Examination.
 1923: Father Stephen released the school hall for reading and studying and constructed a separate dining hall.
 1925: Father Celestine provided a dispensary (presently the principal's office and staff room) and a chapel.
 1929: The institute was equipped with a science lab (now the chemistry lab).
 1 April 1941 
With the passing away of Father Celestine, Father John Chrysostom took charge.
 12 October 1941: Father John Chrysostom provided the school with new classrooms and an additional building (St.John Chrysostom block) for housing the Principals and teachers, Principal's office and some classrooms.

Post independence 
 The center building was demolished and replaced by a double storey structure, whose cornerstone was blessed by Bishop Conradde Vito and laid by Dr. Sampuranand, the Educational Minister of Uttar Pradesh, on 2 August 1947. The new block was dedicated to Bishop Poli for his hard work during his 32-year tenure as Bishop of Allahabad and 50 years of service.
 8 February 1953: St. Francis' Hospital & Charitable Dispensary began, releasing the former school infirmary to be used as the school library and Principal's office.
 6 July 1959: A new teachers' quarter was set up at the entrance of the school.
 1960: The Principal, Father Romano, demolished the old house behind the central building to replace it with a three-storey structure containing eight classrooms, a study hall and dormitories and library. The building was inaugurated on 30 September 1963 by Shri B.N. Das, Governor of Uttar Pradesh. The old dorm was converted to a gymnasium with wooden flooring and equipments.
 1971: Father Leo Lobo became the second Indian Principal of the institute after Father Raphel in 1949.
 1972: The St. John Chrysostom block was demolished for the construction of a primary section block.
 July 1974: The new 2-storied junior block was inaugurated by Father Raymond. The ISC exam system for the 11th standard was done away with and replaced by the new 10+2 system with exams at the end of 10th and another at the end of 12th grade, known as the Indian Certificate of Secondary Education and Indian School Certificate (ICSE and ISC respectively).
 January 1976: The institute was renamed to St. Francis' College, providing intermediate level education for students of 11th and 12th grade. The Science lab was pulled down and replaced by a 2-storied structure.
 May 1977: Father Ignatius Menezes became the Principal and brought about improvements like paving of the pathways and assembly quadrangle, new furniture for class-rooms and the refurbishment of the college structures.
 July 1981: Father Oswald Lewis became Principal and added a third floor to the primary section building in 1983.
 St. Francis' College celebrated its centenary in 1985.

 8 April 1994: Under the tenure of Father Anthony D’Souza, St. Francis' College Swimming Pool was inaugurated by Shri Motilal Vora, the then governor of U.P. and blessed by Rt. Rev. Dr. Albert D’Souza.
 St. Francis' College celebrated its 125 years (Quasquicentennial celebrations) in 2010).

Houses

Uniform
The uniform comprises a white shirt and light grey trousers (shorts for students till Class IV) and black Oxfords along with the college tie and belt marked with navy blue, dark green and white stripes. This is accompanied by navy blue jumpers and blazer in winter, with dark grey woolen trousers. On Saturdays a house coloured shirt with monogram is compulsory.

Publication 
The Franciscan is the annual magazine, with events, literary articles, submissions from students and from staff, and photographs.

Events and festivals 
 P.T. Display and Annual Sports Day is organized every alternate year, where the students take part in a Physical Training display, accompanied by athletics, and track and field events.
 The Annual Concert is organized alternate years, with sound, music, dance and entertainment for the students and parents to watch.
 College Fête- On account of Children's Day, the annual Fête is held on 14 November.
 EXPRESSION started in 2006. It is an inter-college literary and cultural fest, showcasing the student talent from institutions of the city. The three-day fest brings students from Classes IX to XII in a spirit of healthy competition.
 Patron's Day, 4 October is the Feast of St. Francis' of Assisi - Patron Saint. It starts with a Holy Mass in the Chapel at 7am, followed by a general assembly for classes VI to XII and felicitation ceremony for meritorious students as well as for teachers who have completed 25 years of dedicated service to the college, followed by lunch for the staff at noon.
Tennis Court has been newly made here and some tournaments have been started from 2015 April.
St. Francis' College Model United Nations started in 2017. A newly added event in the Franciscan history, St. Francis' College Model UN or SFCMUN is an educational simulation and/or academic activity in which students participates from all over the State of Uttar Pradesh. The two-day fest teaches students diplomacy, international relations and the United Nations. SFCMUN involves and teaches participants researching, public speaking, debating, and writing skills, in addition to critical thinking, teamwork, and leadership abilities. The event garnered limelight in its social circle when it gave full liberty to its student of class XII for the management of the entire two-day event, eventually the event was a big success and was renewed in 2018 and 2019 with a new panel of students taking charge each year.

College anthem 
"We will Answer"
Tho' no bugles may blow and no drums beat,
Tho' we hear not the marching of proud feet,
Tho' no flags and no pennons the day greet,
We will answer when Duty shall call.

To the end we’ll be true; we’ll forget not,
All the care Alma Mater thou spared not,
To the spirit of Francis we’ll fail not,
We will answer when Duty Shall call.

Through the heat of the day and the burden,
And thro' sweat and thro' toil without guerdon,
To dishonour we shall not be lured in;
We will answer when Duty shall call.

With a heart and a will where the right be,
Altho' arduous the task there or light be,
We’ll be found in the thick where the fight be,
We will answer when Duty shall call. 
Words by V. E. Vance

Principals 
Rev. Fr. Rajesh V. D'souza, Diocesan, Lucknow Diocese, 2022 to present
Rev. Fr. Alwyn Moras, Diocesan, Lucknow Diocese, 2016 to 2022
Rev. Fr. Dennis Naresh Lobo, Diocesan, Lucknow Diocese 2011 to 2016
Rev. Fr. Vincent Pinto, Diocesan, Lucknow Diocese, 2006 to 2011
Rev. Fr. Vincent Nazareth, Diocesan, Lucknow Diocese, 2001 to 2006
Rev. Fr. Peter D’Souza, Diocesan, Lucknow Diocese, 1998 to 2001
Rev. Fr. Anthony D’Souza, Diocesan, Lucknow Diocese, 1992 to 1995
Rev. Fr. P. Rodrigues, Diocesan, Lucknow Diocese, 1986 to 1992
Rev. Fr. Oswald Lewis, Diocesan, Lucknow Diocese, 1 July 1981 to 1986 and 1995 to 1998 
Rev. Fr. Baptist D’souza, Diocesan, Lucknow Diocese, 13 January 1979 to 30 June 1981
Rev. Fr. Ignatius Menezes, Diocesan, Lucknow Diocese, 16 May 1977 to 12/01/1979
Rev. Fr. Leo Lobo, Diocesan, Lucknow Diocese, 1 July 1971 to 15 May 1977
Rev. Fr. Romano, O.F.M. Cap, Bologna Province, 1961 to 1968
Rev. Fr. Fulgentius, Bologna Province, 1959 to 1960
Rev. Fr. Clement, O.F, M, Cap, Bologna Province, 1957 to 1959
Rev. Fr. Alfred, O.F.M. Cap,  Bologna Province, 1953 to 1957
Rev. Fr. Raphael De Souza, O.F.M. Cap, Indian Commisariate, 1948 to 1950
Rev. Fr. Ceril, O.F.M. Cap, Bologna Province, 1947 to 1948, 1951 to 1952, 1968 to 1971
Rev. Fr. Jeremiah, O.F.M. Cap, Bologna Province, 1944 to 1947
Rev. Fr. Leo, O.F.M. Cap., Malta Province, 1942 to 1944
Rev. Fr. Jhon Chrysostom, O.F.M.  Cap, Bologna Province, 1935 to 1936, 1941 to 1942
Rev. Fr. Stephen, O.F.M. Cap, Bologna Province, 1923 to 1924	 
Rev. Fr. Celestine, O.F.M. Cap, Bologna Province, 1910 to 1922, 1925 to 1935, 1936 to 1941	 
Rev. Fr. Henry, O.F.M. Cap, Bologna Province, 1909 to 1910 
Rev. Fr. Peter Mary, O.F.M. Cap, Bologna Province, 1908 to 1909	
Rev. Fr. Cherubim, O.F.M, Cap, Bologna Province, 1906 to 1908
Rev. Fr. Lewis of Casola, O.F.M. Cap, Bologna Province, 1903 to 1906
Rev. Fr. Francis Mary of Ravenna,  O.F.M. Cap, Bologna Province, 1901 to 1903
Rev. Fr. Petronius, O.F.M. Cap, Bologna Province, 1900 to 1901 
Rev. Fr. Petronius, O.F.M. Cap, Bologna Province, 1893 to 1899
Rev. Fr. Bartholomew, O.F.M. Cap, Milan Province, 1890 to 1893 and from 1899 to 1900
Rev. Fr. Emanuel, O.F.M. Cap Belgian Province, 1886 to 1890
Rev. Fr. Nobert, O.F.M. Cap Bologana Province (founder of St. Francis' School) 26 April 1885 to 1886

Alumni: Old Franciscans' Association 
The alumni association of St. Francis' College is called the Old Franciscans' Association (OFA). The association organises cultural, social and educational events that serve to stimulate and maintain interest among its members and institution. Chief among the events organised is Crossroads, an annual cultural show which sees participation from most of the schools and colleges of the city. It holds the Old Boys' Dinner every year as a reunion for past students. It has helped the college in issuing its own postal stamp.

Notable alumni 

 Neal Mohan: Youtube CEO.
 Denzil Keelor: Air Marshal, Vir Chakra, Keerti Chakra, hero of the 1965 war against Pakistan,
 Trevor Keelor: Wing Commander, Vir Chakra, Vayu Sena Medal, hero of the 1965 war against Pakistan.
 Anil K. Rajvanshi, Director of Nimbkar Agricultural Research Institute and winner of Padma Shri and numerous other awards.
 Prashant Pathak, Canada based entrepreneur and investor, CEO of Ekagrata Inc., appointee of the Government of Canada to BDC.
 Jimmy Shergill, Bollywood actor, studied for ten years at the school
 Gopal Khanna, Former Director of the Agency for Healthcare Research and Quality, USA. Previously he was Minnesota's Chief Information Officer.
 Rajesh Gopinathan, CEO of Tata Consultancy Services, alumnus of Indian Institute of Management Ahmedabad.
 Sapan Saxena, Indian author, best known for his novels Finders, Keepers, UNNS-The Captivation & The Tenth Riddle

See also 
 Colvin Taluqdars' College
 Saint Francis of Assisi
 Catholic Diocese of Lucknow
 Loreto Convent
 La Martiniere Lucknow

References

External links 
 

Catholic secondary schools in India
Boys' schools in India
High schools and secondary schools in Uttar Pradesh
Christian schools in Uttar Pradesh
Private schools in Lucknow
Educational institutions established in 1885
1885 establishments in India